Vaniyambadi taluk is a taluk in Tirupathur district of the Indian state of Tamil Nadu. The headquarters of the taluk is the town of Vaniyambadi.

Demographics
According to the 2011 census, the taluk of Vaniyambadi had a population of 335,767 with 168,705  males and 167,062 females. There were 990 women for every 1000 men. The taluk had a literacy rate of 67.79. Child population in the age group below 6 was 19,677 Males and 18,333 Females.

References 

Taluks of Tirupathur district